This is a list of University of New Mexico presidents includes all permanent and interim presidents from the beginning of instruction in 1892 to the present.
List of presidents

External links 

 University of New Mexico website
 University of New Mexico, Office of the President
 University of New Mexico, University Archives

 
University of New Mexico presidents
New Mex